Cristian Gérard Alfaro Gonzáles (born 30 August 1976, also known as Mustafa Habibi) is a professional footballer who plays as a striker for Liga 2 club PSIM Yogyakarta. He has been 4 times Liga Indonesia top scorer and has scored 249 goals in the Liga Indonesia. In his early career he played along with Álvaro Recoba in the Uruguay U20. As of 3 November 2010, he officially holds an Indonesian passport and has become the first naturalized player to be called up to the Indonesian national team.

Club career

Sud América 
In 1995, he joined the Uruguayan club Sud América. During the 28 months there, he played only once, scoring no goals. After being loaned to Huracán Corrientes, he went back to Sud America in the starting lineup. He played 12 times and scored one goal.

Huracán Corrientes (loan)
He was loaned to Huracán Corrientes where he played three times without scoring a goal.

Deportivo Maldonado
In 2000, on expiry of his contract, he moved to Deportivo Maldonado on a free transfer. He played 22 times and scored one goal.

PSM Makassar
He started playing in Indonesia in 2003, joining PSM Makassar. In that season he scored 27 goals. PSM won the Liga Indonesia in that season. He was fined Rp20 million for hitting one of the officials from Persita Tangerang and was suspended.

Persik Kediri
Free from suspension, he joined and led Persik Kediri to become champions of Liga Indonesia in 2006. In 2008, he was sentenced to suspension by the PSSI for unsportsmanlike behaviour. A financial crisis at Persik Kediri led Persik management to rationalize salaries. Gonzáles was one of the few players who was against the decision and looked for another club.

Persib Bandung
On 30 January 2009, Persib Bandung management announced that they had recruited Gonzáles with remission from PSSI chairman Nurdin Halid. Gonzáles was contracted as a loan from Persik Kediri and was paid 60 million rupiahs per month by Persib Bandung.

He debuted as a starter in the Super League for Persib against Persipura Jayapura in a 1–1 draw thanks to a goal he scored. In 2008, he played 16 times in the League and scored 14 goals, making Gonzáles a top scorer in the Super League.

After his contract at Persik Kediri expired, he was immediately hired by Persib Bandung. In the 2009–10 pre-season, he scored a goal for Persib in the East Java Government Cup. In the 2009–10 season, he scored 51 goals.

Persisam Putra Samarinda
In September 2011, Gonzáles signed a year contract with Persisam Putra Samarinda. He made his league debut on 4 December 2011 in a match against PSAP Sigli. 4 December 2011, Gonzáles scored his first goal for Persisam Putra Samarinda in the 32nd minute at the Harapan Bangsa Stadium, Banda Aceh.

Arema FC
After his contract at Persisam Samarinda expired. He joined Arema Cronus and wore number 10. Gonzáles made his league debut on 9 January 2013 in a match against Persidafon Dafonsoro. On 9 January 2013, Gonzáles scored his first goal for Arema in the 9th minute at the Kanjuruhan Stadium, Malang.

Madura United
He was signed for Madura United to play in Liga 1 in the 2018 season. Gonzáles made his league debut on 2 April 2018 in a match against PS TIRA at the Sultan Agung Stadium, Bantul.

PSS Sleman
In 2018, Gonzales signed a one-year contract with Indonesian Liga 2 club PSS Sleman. On 4 December 2018 PSS successfully won the 2018 Liga 2 Final and promoted to Liga 1, after defeated Semen Padang 2–0 at the Pakansari Stadium, Cibinong. He made 19 league appearances and scored 15 goals for PSS Sleman.

PSIM Yogyakarta
He was signed for PSIM Yogyakarta to play in Liga 2 in the 2019 season. He made 17 league appearances and scored 9 goals for PSIM Yogyakarta.

RANS Cilegon
In 2021, Gonzáles signed a contract with Indonesian Liga 2 club RANS Cilegon. He made his league debut on 5 October against Persekat Tegal. Gonzáles scored his first goal for RANS Cilegon against Badak Lampung in the 18th minute at the Gelora Bung Karno Madya Stadium, Jakarta.

International career
Although Gonzales began his career in Indonesia as an Uruguayan, he became an Indonesian national on 3 November 2010 after a six-year wait, including not going home to his father's funeral. He is the first naturalised football player in Indonesia and the first to join the Indonesia national football team. His debut with the national team was on 21 November 2010, in a friendly game against Timor-Leste, where he scored twice in a 6–0 win.

International goals
Score and Result list Indonesia'a goal tally first

|-
| 1. || rowspan="2"| 21 November 2010 || rowspan="2"| Gelora Sriwijaya Stadium, Palembang, Indonesia || rowspan="2"|  ||  || rowspan="2" style="text-align:center;" | 6–0 || rowspan="2"| Friendly || rowspan="2"| 
|-
| 2. || 
|-
| 3. || 24 November 2010 || Gelora Sriwijaya Stadium, Palembang, Indonesia ||  ||  ||  || Friendly || 
|-
| 4. || 1 December 2010 || Gelora Bung Karno Stadium, Tanah Abang, Indonesia ||  ||  ||  || rowspan=3|2010 AFF Championship || 
|-
| 5. || 16 December 2010 || Gelora Bung Karno Stadium, Indonesia ||  ||  ||  || 
|-
| 6. || 19 December 2010 || Gelora Bung Karno Stadium, Indonesia ||  ||  ||  || 
|-
| 7. || rowspan="2"| 28 July 2011 || rowspan="2"| Gelora Bung Karno Stadium, Indonesia || rowspan="2"|  ||  || rowspan="2" style="text-align:center;" | 4–3 || rowspan="2"| 2014 FIFA World Cup qualification || rowspan="2"|
|-
| 8. || 
|-
| 9. || 22 August 2011 || Manahan Stadium, Surakarta, Indonesia ||  ||  ||  || Friendly || 
|-
| 10. || rowspan="2"| 11 October 2011 || rowspan="2"| Gelora Bung Karno Stadium, Indonesia || rowspan="2"|  ||  || rowspan="2" style="text-align:center;" | 2–3 || rowspan="2"| 2014 FIFA World Cup qualification || rowspan="2"|
|-
| 11. || 
|-  style="background:#8fcfdf;"
| — || 21 June 2014 || Gelora Delta Stadium, Sidoarjo, Indonesia || ||  ||  || Unofficial friendly || 
|-
| 12. || 30 March 2015 || Gelora Delta Stadium, Sidoarjo, Indonesia ||  ||  ||  || Friendly || 
|}

Personal life
Gonzáles was born in Montevideo, Uruguay. He married his wife, Eva Nurida Siregar, in 1995 and has 4 children. On 9 October 2003, he converted to Islam and chose Mustafa Habibi as his Islamic name. He gained an Indonesian passport in 2010. Gonzáles also appeared in Indonesian soap operas and television commercials.

Controversies
Gonzáles is known for his temper, and has been reprimanded by the PSSI on a number of occasions.

Trivia
He is one of the most lethal strikers in the history of the Indonesian football competition. His ability to kick, head, score, and in positioning and game vision are renowned, and he has a strong physique.

When playing in Uruguay, he was an attacking midfielder. He was not at his best before finally moving to Indonesia and joining PSM Makassar as a striker. Since then he has proved his quality as a powerful striker.

Cristian Gonzales is a popular figure among Indonesians and has starred in commercials speaking Bahasa Indonesia.

In 2006, he was the most expensive player in the Liga Indonesia according to the data from the Indonesian Football Association at Rp 1.2 billion

On 21 November 2010 Cristian Gonzales debuted as a member of Indonesia's national football team in a game against Timor Leste scoring two goals, and  joined Indonesia's core national football team in the 2010 AFF Suzuki Cup.

Honours

Club
Persik Kediri
 Premier Division: 2006

PSS Sleman
 Liga 2: 2018
RANS Cilegon
 Liga 2 runner-up: 2021

International
Indonesia
AFF Championship runner-up:  2010

Individual
 Liga Indonesia Top scorer (3): 2005, 2006, 2007–08
 Indonesia Super League Top scorer: 2008–09 (shared with Boaz Solossa)
 Piala Indonesia Top scorer: 2010
 Piala Presiden Top scorer: 2017

References

External links

1976 births
Living people
Indonesian Muslims
Footballers from Montevideo
Indonesian footballers
Indonesia international footballers
Uruguayan footballers
Indonesian people of Uruguayan descent
Uruguayan emigrants to Indonesia
Converts to Islam
Uruguayan Muslims
Indonesian former Christians
Sud América players
Huracán Corrientes footballers
Deportivo Maldonado players
PSM Makassar players
Persik Kediri players
Persib Bandung players
Persisam Putra Samarinda players
Arema F.C. players
Madura United F.C. players
PSS Sleman players
PSIM Yogyakarta players
RANS Nusantara F.C. players
Expatriate footballers in Uruguay
Liga 1 (Indonesia) players
Liga 2 (Indonesia) players
Association football forwards
Indonesian Premier Division players
Naturalised citizens of Indonesia